The 2003 LSU Tigers football team represented Louisiana State University (LSU) during the 2003 NCAA Division I-A football season.  Coached by Nick Saban, the LSU Tigers played their home games at Tiger Stadium in Baton Rouge, Louisiana.  The Tigers compiled an 11–1 regular season record and then defeated the No. 5 Georgia Bulldogs in the SEC Championship Game,  Afterward, LSU was invited to play the Oklahoma Sooners in the Sugar Bowl for the Bowl Championship Series (BCS) national title.  LSU won the BCS National Championship Game, the first national football championship for LSU since 1958.

The 2003 college football regular season ended with three one-loss teams in BCS contention: the LSU Tigers, Oklahoma Sooners, and USC Trojans.  USC ended the regular season ranked No. 1 and LSU No. 2 in both the AP Poll and the Coaches' Poll.  Media controversy ensued when the BCS computer-based selection system chose LSU and Oklahoma as the participants in the BCS title game, largely based on an assessment of the relative difficulty of the three teams' 2003 schedules.  During the bowl games, LSU beat No. 3 Oklahoma 21–14 in the Sugar Bowl (designated as the BCS National Championship Game for the 2003–04 season), while USC defeated the No. 4 Michigan Wolverines 28–14 in the Rose Bowl. LSU was ranked No. 1 in the final Coaches' Poll (which was contractually obligated to rank the BCS champion No. 1) while USC remained No. 1 in the final AP Poll.

Schedule

Roster

Game summaries

Louisiana-Monroe

Arizona

Western Illinois
Western Illinois was ranked No. 1 in I-AA and played the Tigers close, only down 13-7 in the 3rd quarter. The Tigers had fumbled twice in the red zone, missed an extra point and a field goal and botched a punt. QB Matt Mauck had a career game to extend the lead in the second half. He set career highs with 305 yards passing and four touchdowns, giving LSU its first 3-0 start in five years.

Georgia

Mississippi State

Florida

South Carolina

Auburn

Louisiana Tech

Alabama

Ole Miss

Arkansas

SEC Championship Game

Sugar Bowl

LSU Tigers in the 2004 National Football League Draft 

https://www.pro-football-reference.com/draft/2004.htm

References

LSU
LSU Tigers football seasons
BCS National Champions
Southeastern Conference football champion seasons
Sugar Bowl champion seasons
LSU Tigers football